Blood and Water may refer to:

Publications
 Blood and Water (short story collection), by Tim Winton
 Blood & Water, a comic book by Judd Winick and Tomm Coker
 On Earth's Remotest Bounds: Year One: Blood and Water, a novel by Kenneth C. Flint

Television
 Blood and Water (Canadian TV series), a 2015 Canadian drama television series
 Blood & Water (South African TV series), a 2020 South African mystery drama television series
 "Blood and Water" (All Saints)
 "Blood and Water" (The Shield)
 "Blood and Water," an episode of All Creatures Great and Small
 Blood and Water, an installment of the TV series Ghosts, directed by Terry Johnson

Other uses
 "Blood and Water" (song), by Palm Springs
 The final of Jesus Christ's Holy Wounds

See also
 Blood is thicker than water